Ronald Fred Seikaly (born May 10, 1965) is a Lebanese-American former professional basketball player. Seikaly was one of the first internationally born players to make an impact on American basketball. 

He was considered one of the top college players from the Syracuse basketball program, Seikaly's stellar offense and defense placed him among the school's all-time leaders in rebounds, points and blocks, while earning several nationally recognized awards and honors. His number 4 jersey was retired by Syracuse and raised to the rafters of the Carrier Dome.

Drafted into the National Basketball Association (NBA) by the Miami Heat with the 9th pick of the 1988 draft and the first ever pick for the Heat, Seikaly developed into one of the best centers in the NBA and the team's top offensive and defensive contributors–winning NBA player of the week twice–and also amassing many of the team's records (of which some are still standing).

Seikaly earned the 1990 NBA Most Improved Player Award and later played for the Golden State Warriors, Orlando Magic and New Jersey Nets and in Spain with FC Barcelona. He was also part of the United States national basketball team during the 1986 FIBA World Championship, winning gold.
After his retirement from basketball, Seikaly became a successful real estate developer. He also works in electronic music as a producer/DJ, and hosted a radio show, Sugar Free Radio, on Sirius/XM.

Early life
Seikaly was born in Beirut, Lebanon, in 1965. In 1975, at the age of 10, he moved from Beirut to the US, where he attended a boarding school in Massachusetts. In 1979, at the age of 14, he moved to Athens, Greece, where he spent the rest of his youth.

While in Greece, he attended and graduated from the American School, also known as ACS Athens. As a youth, he played basketball, and also excelled in volleyball, association football, and track & field. At age 14, he also began to DJ.

In 1981, when Seikaly was 16, the Panathinaikos basketball player Takis Koroneos took note of him, after he purchased a pair of large basketball sneakers in Koroneos' athletics store. On the recommendation of Koroneos to the club's management, Seikaly was selected to join Panathinaikos' men's senior team, in order to begin training and practicing with them. In 1982, at age 17, he first played with the team in a tournament in Cyprus.

He continued to train and practice with Panathinaikos until 1983. However, because he did not have a Greek passport, he was not able to register with the team to play in any games in the Greek Basket League, since no foreign players were allowed to play in the league until 1988.

College career
In 1983, Seikaly moved from Greece to the United States and began attending Syracuse University in central New York, where he played college basketball. He played center for the Syracuse Orange men's basketball team. He led his Syracuse team to the 1987 NCAA Tournament championship finals against the Indiana Hoosiers during his junior year, after averaging 22 points and 11 rebounds per game throughout the tournament. He was an All-American, and was also named to the John R. Wooden All-American Team. He graduated from Syracuse as the school's all-time leading rebounder, second in school history in blocked shots, and fourth in school history in scoring. At the time, he was only the second player ever to record 1,000 points and rebounds during his tenure at Syracuse. He was named to the Orange's All 20th Century Team, and his number 4 jersey has been retired and raised to the rafters at the Carrier Dome.

Professional career

Miami Heat (1988–1994)
Seikaly was taken by the Miami Heat with the 9th pick in the first round of the 1988 NBA draft. As well as being the franchise's first ever college draft pick, Seikaly became the first player born in Lebanon to compete in the National Basketball Association (NBA).

The rookie center quickly emerged not only as a pivotal player within the team, but also among the league's top centers. In his second season, he led the Heat in points (16.6), rebounds (10.4) and blocks (1.7) while placing sixth in the league in rebounding. At the conclusion of the season he was awarded with the NBA Most Improved Player Award.

In the 1990–91 season, Seikaly increased his rebounding average to 11.1 rebounds per game while maintaining his 16 points per game average and then they acquired other young players to serve as scoring options such as Glen Rice and Steve Smith. In the 1991–92 season, Seikaly again averaged 16 points and 11 rebounds (6th in the league) as the Heat, bolstered by his play and Rice's scoring, led the team to 38 wins and the first playoff berth for the franchise. Despite the breakthrough, Miami was no match for the defending champions, the Michael Jordan-led Chicago Bulls, who swept the Heat in three games. For the series against the Bulls, Seikaly averaged 19.1 points with 9.2 rebounds.

Seikaly increased his scoring to 17.3 and once again averaged 11.8 rebounds a game (8th in the league) during the 1992–93 season. He managed to win the NBA player of the week after averaging 30 points and 20 Rebounds for the week of March 7. The following season featured increased scoring by Rice and Smith, and Seikaly averaged 15.1 points a game for third on the team while leading the team in rebounds with 10.3 rebounds per game. The Heat won 42 games, good enough to make the playoffs. Facing off against the Atlanta Hawks in the first round.

Seikaly's career with Miami saw him setting numerous team records, including blocks (8), rebounds (34) and double–doubles. During his run with the Heat, he had the nickname "The Spin Doctor", due to his trademark low-post spin moves. On November 2, 1994, Seikaly was traded to the Golden State Warriors.

His career highs with the Heat are 40 points, 34 rebounds, 8 blocks, 8 assists, and 5 steals.

Golden State Warriors (1994–1996)
Seikaly only played in 36 games during the 1994–95 season, but started in all but one of those appearances averaging 12 points and 7 rebounds per game for the Warriors who were decimated by injuries. He would go on to start in 60 of 64 games in the 95–96 season, averaging 12 points and 7.8 rebounds, but the Warriors once again were plagued by injuries and could not reach the playoffs. In November 1996, he was once again traded, this time to the Orlando Magic.

Orlando Magic (1996–1998)
The Magic had been a dominant Eastern Conference team, but lost superstar center Shaquille O'Neal, and Seikaly was brought in to fill the void. Despite playing alongside other veteran scorers such as Horace Grant, Nick Anderson and Dennis Scott, Seikaly boosted his scoring to 17.3 points per game for second on the team behind All-Star Penny Hardaway, and led the team in rebounds per game (9.5) and blocks (1.4). The Magic won 45 games and entered the playoffs as the 7th seed in the conference, facing off against Seikaly's old team in Miami, who then featured an All-Star center Alonzo Mourning. Despite taking a 2–0 lead in Miami, the Magic responded with two wins at home to tie the series at 2 games apiece, but injuries forced Seikaly out of the 4th and deciding 5th games in which the Heat won to advance.

Seikaly would start in 47 games to start the 1997–98 season, but in February he was traded to the Utah Jazz, a deal that was rescinded due to Seikaly's refusal to report, Orlando then responded by sending him to the New Jersey Nets. He averaged 16 points and 9.5 rebounds per game in his stint in Orlando.

New Jersey Nets (1998–1999)
Following his arrival in New Jersey, Seikaly had a career ending foot injury and only played in 9 games to finish the 1997–98 season, and would only play in 9 games of the lockout shortened 1998–99 season before retiring from the league. He holds NBA career averages of 14.7 points per game, 9.5 rebounds per game, and 1.3 blocks per game.

FC Barcelona (2000)
In 2000, Seikaly moved to the Spanish ACB League club Barcelona. In three games played in Spain's 2000–01 ACB season, he averaged 15.3 points, 8.0 rebounds, 1.7 steals, and 0.7 blocks per game, in 28.3 minutes played per game. With Barcelona, he also played in the top-level European-wide club competition, the EuroLeague. In the EuroLeague's 2000–01 season, he played in a total of four games. He averaged 13.0 points, 5.3 rebounds, 1.0 assists, 1.3 steals, and 1.0 blocks per game, in 24.5 minutes played per game.

Career statistics

NBA career statistics

Regular season

Playoffs

|-
|style="text-align:left;"|1992
|style="text-align:left;"|Miami
|3||3||39.0||.543||.000||.750||10.0||1.3||0.3||1.7||20.7
|-
|style="text-align:left;"|1994
|style="text-align:left;"|Miami
|5||3||33.0||.438||.000||.565||9.4||1.6||0.8||1.4||8.2
|-
|style="text-align:left;"|1997
|style="text-align:left;"|Orlando
|3||3||28.7||.318||.000||.714||5.3||0.0||0.3||1.0||6.3
|-
|style="text-align:left;"|1998
|style="text-align:left;"|New Jersey
|3||0||12.3||.778||.000||.667||3.0||0.0||0.3||0.0||6.0
|- class="sortbottom"
|style="text-align:center;" colspan="2"|Career
||14|||9||28.9||.480||.000||.676||7.3||0.9||0.5||1.1||10.0
|}

EuroLeague career statistics

|-
| style="text-align:left;"| 2000–01
| style="text-align:left; "rowspan=1| Barcelona
| 4 || 4 || 24.5 || .465 || .000 || .600 || 5.3 || 1.0 || 1.3 || 1.0 || 13.0 || 11.3
|- class="sortbottom"
| style="text-align:left;" rowspan=2 |Career
| style="text-align:left;"|
| 4 || 4 || 24.5 || .465 || .000 || .600 || 5.3 || 1.0 || 1.3 || 1.0 || 13.0 || 11.3

National team career

Greece
Seikaly first began training and practicing with the senior Greek national team, in 1983, at the age of 18. However, because he was unable to acquire a Greek passport, he was unable to represent Greece's national team in any official games. Despite that obstacle, he continued to train and practice with Greece's national team until 1986. Despite not being able to play with Greece, Seikaly felt connected to the national team, since he had trained and practiced with it for 3 years. Because of that, he sat next to the Greek team's bench at the final of the 1987 Athens EuroBasket, in which Greece beat the Soviet Union, to win the tournament's gold medal.

United States
Seikaly became a naturalized citizen of the US. He was then able to represent Team USA at both the 
1986 Goodwill Games, and the 1986 FIBA World Championship. As a member of Team USA, he won gold medals at both tournaments. In 7 games played during the 1986 FIBA World Championship
1986 World Championship for Men 10 - Ronald Fred Seikaly.</ref>

Lebanon
Seikaly asked FIBA to grant him permission to represent the Lebanese national team. FIBA granted the request, and Seikaly was thus able to represent Lebanon. With Lebanon, he played at the 1999 West Asian Championship, which was held in Beirut. Seikaly helped the Lebanese win the tournament's silver medal. He averaged 30 points and 20 rebounds in those games.

Musical career

Seikaly, an avid lover of music, started DJing at the age of 14 whilst living in Greece. After retiring from basketball, he developed his passion into a musical career as a professional DJ and music producer. "Sports will always be my love, but music will always be my passion," he said. 
Seikaly has been producing and working in the genres of house, deep house, tech house and techno, and has played in many of the clubbing meccas across the globe.

He has released many solo EPs including a lot of his early work "House Calls" in 2010, "East West" EP in 2012 and "East West" EP volume 2 in 2014. He then followed them up with "Holdin On" and "Signs" EP in 2015 and "The Sword" EP in 2016. In 2012, Rony produced a full mix album titled "Nervous Nitelife Presents Rony Seikaly" and he has also released on esteemed imprints such as Stride, Moon Harbor, Radiant, Saved, Suara, Yoshitoshi, Nervous, Stereo, Subliminal and many more. Since 2019, he has started his own record label "STRIDE" that has involved mostly his own work, with standout producers around the world joining him for remixes, including Bedouin, Luciano, Gorge, Audiofly, Hector Couto, Davi, Nick Curly, Black Circle and others. The label has been a resounding success with many chart hitting successes, including 5 tracks in the top 10, and currently finds itself in the Top 3 Deep House record labels... This is almost unheard of in just over a year of a label and shows Rony's keen ear for music.

He has also ran his own radio show on Sirius XM satellite radio called SugarFreeRadio which aired four days per week and was a resounding success since 2012.

Songs

2010: "Come with Me" (featuring Polina) (Subliminal Records)
2010: "Let You Go" (featuring Polina) (Subliminal Records)
2010: "Let You Go Part Two" (featuring Polina), remix by Cedric Gervais (Subliminal Records)
2011: "Take Me Higher" (Subliminal Records)
2011: "The World Is Beautiful" (Subliminal Records)
2011: "Personal Stereo" (Swing Records)
2011: "Crazy Powder" (Nervous Inc)
2012: "MILF" (Juicy Records)
2012: "Funk The Munk" (Juicy Records)
2012: "Mood That I Love" (Nervous Records)
2012: "Desert Nights" (Nervous Records)
2012: "Oh Yeah" (Swing Records)
2012: "Perfect Match" (Swing Records)
2012: "Illusion" (Nervous Records)
2012: "Le Freak" (with Antranig) (Stereo Productions)
2012: "Welcome to the Machine" (Nervous Inc.)
2012: "Happy Trees" (Nervous Inc.) 
2013: "You Make Me Feel" (with Jean Claude Ades) (Be Crazy Music) 
2013: "Thanks for Everything" (Perfect Driver Music)
2013: "Can You Hear Me" (Suara Records)
2013: "TATOUS" (Nervous Records)
2014: "Into me" (Be Crazy)
2014: "Devotion" (Be Crazy)
2014: "5htp" (Be Crazy)
2015: "Groove Box" (Stereo Productions)
2015: "Holdin On" (Yoshitoshi Records)
2015: "Faces" (Yoshitoshi Records)
2015: "Don't Do That" (Xima Records)
2015: "Do You Take Anything" (Xima Records)
2015: "U Turn" (Xima Records)
2016: "The Sword" (Yoshitoshi Records)
2016: "All of A Sudden" (Yoshitoshi Records)
2016: "Loyalty" (Yoshitoshi Records)
2017: "Should I Stay" (Yoshitoshi Records)

Featured

2011: "Fly Away" (In The Screen vs. Rony Seikaly feat. Craig David) (Erick Morillo, Harry Choo Choo Romero & José Nunez Mix)

Personal life
Seikaly speaks four languages fluently: English, Greek, Arabic, and French.

Before playing in the NBA with the Miami Heat, Seikaly was offered a contract by the Greek Basket League team AEK Athens, but he turned it down, and opted to sign with the Heat instead. During his NBA playing career, he returned to Greece during the off-season, to visit his friends and family members. Seikaly owns a villa in Mykonos, Greece, and he still vacations there.

When Magic Johnson returned to the NBA HIV-positive, and there was opposition to his inclusion in the league, because of his health status, Seikaly challenged him to a game of one-on-one, to show everyone that HIV is not contagious by touch.

Seikaly owns and runs a multi-million dollar real estate investment company.

Seikaly was formerly married to Mexican model Elsa Benítez, the 2001 and 2006 cover girl for the Sports Illustrated swimsuit issues. They divorced in 2005; they have a daughter, Mila.

Since July 2015, Seikaly has been married to Brazilian fashion blogger and model Martha Graeff, to whom he became engaged on the Greek island of Mykonos.

Charity
Seikaly is involved in many charities, such as the Miami Heat's Corporate Education and "Shoot for the Stars" programs, and the Make A Wish Foundation. He also founded the Rony Seikaly Golf Tournament to benefit cystic fibrosis research.

Revenues from the sale of his 2012 album, Nervous Nitelife Presents Rony Seikaly, went to the Children's Department at the Sylvester Comprehensive Cancer Foundation in Miami.

See also
 List of National Basketball Association players with most rebounds in a game

References

External links 
Basketball
NBA.com Historical Player File

FIBA Archive Profile
Euroleague.net Profile
Spanish League Archive Profile 
Spanish League Profile 
Music
Official Rony Seikaly Music website
Facebook / iTunes / YouTube
Discogs.com: Rony Seikaly page

1965 births
Living people
1986 FIBA World Championship players
All-American college men's basketball players
American expatriate basketball people in Spain
American house musicians
American men's basketball players
Centers (basketball)
Competitors at the 1986 Goodwill Games
FC Barcelona Bàsquet players
FIBA World Championship-winning players
Golden State Warriors players
Greek expatriate basketball people in the United States
Lebanese emigrants to Greece
Lebanese emigrants to the United States
Lebanese men's basketball players
Sportspeople of Lebanese descent
Liga ACB players
Miami Heat draft picks
Miami Heat players
New Jersey Nets players
Orlando Magic players
Panathinaikos B.C. players
Sportspeople from Beirut
Syracuse Orange men's basketball players
United States men's national basketball team players